The Gazebo is a play by Alec Coppel based on a story by Coppel and his wife Myra.

Broadway
It opened at Broadway's Lyceum Theatre on 12 December 1958 and ran for 266 performances, closing on 27 June 1959. Walter Slezak and Jayne Meadows played Elliott and Nell, and the director was Jerome Chodorov.

Brooks Atkinson in the New York Times claimed it was "as real as a TV crime play and a thousand times more diverting," though fellow critic Robert Coleman maintained that "There were times when a good gust of wind might have blown The Gazebo right off the  Lyceum's stage." The subsequent US tour starred Tom Ewell and Jan Sterling.

The production only recouped 50% of its investment but Coppel earned a reported $54,000 in royalties from the Broadway run plus $60,000 from the sale of the movie rights.

London productions
In London, Ian Carmichael and Moira Lister were the stars of the West End production, directed by Anthony Sharp. This opened at the Savoy Theatre on 29 March 1960 and ran for 479 performances. "The Gazebo is one of those modern murder plays which depend on comedy rather than mystery," noted Theatre World editor Frances Stephens, "and no actor is better equipped than Ian Carmichael, with his wholesome fooling and overall 'niceness', to take any embarrassment out of a laughter-making murder theme, even with the corpse in full view."

The movie of the same name is an adaptation of the play.
The French film Jo, released in 1971 and starring Louis de Funès and Claude Gensac, was also based on the play. Another French version, this time for TV - Une femme dans les bras, un cadavre sur le dos, with Jean Lefebvre and Blanche Ravalec - appeared in 1995.

References

External links
Review of Broadway production at Variety

1958 plays
British plays adapted into films
American plays adapted into films
Broadway plays
West End plays
Plays by Alec Coppel